The Ceylon national cricket team, later Sri Lanka national cricket team, represents Sri Lanka in international cricket since its first international representative match in 1927. Before Sri Lanka became a full member of the International Cricket Council (ICC) with Test and One Day International (ODI) status on 21 July 1981, Sri Lanka had associate member status from 1965 to 1981. From 1927 to 1981 all top-level international matches were of first-class or List A status. Sri Lanka first competed in top-level international cricket in 1975, when they played against West Indies during 1975 Cricket World Cup.

Key

First-class cricket

First-class record

List of matches

Notes

References

Cricket records and statistics
Sri Lanka in international cricket